The 1995 AAA Championships was an outdoor track and field competition organised by the Amateur Athletic Association (AAA), held from 15 to 16 July at Alexander Stadium in Birmingham, England. It was considered the de facto national championships for the United Kingdom.

Medal summary

Men

Women

References

AAA Championships
AAA Championships
Athletics Outdoor
AAA Championships
Sports competitions in Birmingham, West Midlands
Athletics competitions in England